Bobby Gunn (born Robert Williamson, December 25, 1973) is a retired Canadian professional boxer and bareknuckle boxer.

Career

Gunn was born on December 25, 1973, in Ontario, Canada, into an Irish Traveller family from the Republic of Ireland and the United Kingdom.

Gunn would make a name for himself in the Canadian amateur scene. He had a successful amateur career that spanned seven years.
Gunn made his professional boxing debut on April 28, 1989, Tucson, Arizona, winning by unanimous decision over Richard Palmer. In his third pro bout, Gunn stopped future titlist Quirino Garcia in the third round. He would go on to win eight of his next ten fights, before an 11-year hiatus from professional boxing, although he did compete in more than 60 bare-knuckle bouts. 

He resurfaced in 2004 and knocked out four straight foes before competing in one of the most notorious matches of the last decade. Gunn came back in 2017 in a fight against Roy Jones Jr but was stopped in the eighth round.

Gunn then put together a solid six-bout unbeaten streak, including a third round stoppage in a rematch against Gross, where he won three different titles. He once again found himself in the limelight on July 11, 2009, when he challenged Ring Magazine and International Boxing Federation champion Tomasz Adamek. Although he was a big underdog against the pound for pound rated Adamek, Gunn hung in tough and had moments of success, but his night was once again cut short. Although the referee admitted after the bout he would have let him continue, ringside physician decided Gunn had taken too many clean punches and stopped the bout following the fourth round.

Professional boxing record

|-
|align="center" colspan=8|21 Wins (18 knockouts, 3 decisions), 7 Losses (5 knockouts, 2 decisions), 1 Draw, 1 No Contest 
|-
! align="center" style="border-style: none none solid solid; background: #e3e3e3"|Result
! align="center" style="border-style: none none solid solid; background: #e3e3e3"|Record
! align="center" style="border-style: none none solid solid; background: #e3e3e3"|Opponent
! align="center" style="border-style: none none solid solid; background: #e3e3e3"|Type
! align="center" style="border-style: none none solid solid; background: #e3e3e3"|Round
! align="center" style="border-style: none none solid solid; background: #e3e3e3"|Date
! align="center" style="border-style: none none solid solid; background: #e3e3e3"|Location
! align="center" style="border-style: none none solid solid; background: #e3e3e3"|Notes
|-align=center
|Loss
|
|align=left| Roy Jones Jr.
|TKO
|8
|02/17/2017
|align=left| Chase Center, Wilmington, Delaware
|align=left|
|-align=center
|Loss
|
|align=left| Glen Johnson
|UD
|8
|18/12/2013
|align=left| Sands Casino Resort Bethlehem, Bethlehem, Pennsylvania
|align=left|
|-align=center
|Loss
|
|align=left| James Toney
|RTD
|5
|07/04/2012
|align=left| Lander's Center, Southaven, Mississippi
|align=left|
|-
|Loss
|
|align=left|Tomasz Adamek
|RTD
|4
|11/07/2009
|align=left|Prudential Center, Newark, New Jersey
|align=left|
|-
|Win
|
|align=left| Brad Gregory
|TKO
|4
|25/02/2009
|align=left| Medieval Times, Lyndhurst, New Jersey
|align=left|
|-
|Win
|
|align=left| Shelby Gross
|TKO
|3
|20/11/2008
|align=left| Celebrity Theatre, Phoenix, Arizona
|align=left|
|-
|Win
|
|align=left| "Jammin" James Morrow
|TKO
|5
|12/07/2008
|align=left| Bernie Robbins Stadium, Atlantic City, New Jersey
|align=left|
|-
|Draw
|
|align=left| Cory Phelps
|PTS
|6
|22/03/2008
|align=left| Fort McDowell Casino, Fountain Hills, Arizona
|align=left|
|-
|Win
|
|align=left| Benito Fernandez
|KO
|2
|25/08/2007
|align=left| Robert E. Lee High School, Springfield, Virginia
|align=left|
|-
|Win
|
|align=left| Elija Dickens
|RTD
|1
|09/06/2007
|align=left| ABC Sports Complex, Springfield, Virginia
|align=left|
|-
|Loss
|
|align=left|Enzo Maccarinelli
|TKO
|1
|07/04/2007
|align=left|Millennium Stadium, Cardiff
|align=left|
|-
|Win
|
|align=left| Shannon Landberg
|TKO
|7
|16/09/2006
|align=left| LCO Casino, Hayward, Wisconsin
|align=left|
|-
|No Contest
|
|align=left| Shelby Gross
|NC
|2
|31/03/2006
|align=left| Nashville Municipal Auditorium, Nashville, Tennessee
|align=left|
|-
|Win
|
|align=left| Jimmy Garrett
|KO
|1
|06/12/2005
|align=left| Omni New Daisy Theater, Memphis, Tennessee
|align=left|
|-
|Win
|
|align=left| Jeff Holcomb
|TKO
|5
|02/06/2005
|align=left| Tennessee State Fairgrounds arena, Nashville, Tennessee
|align=left|
|-
|Win
|
|align=left| Earl Kirkendall
|TKO
|1
|25/02/2005
|align=left| Nashville Municipal Auditorium, Nashville, Tennessee
|align=left|
|-
|Win
|
|align=left| Leon Hinnant
|TKO
|1
|11/12/2004
|align=left| Greensboro, North Carolina
|align=left|
|-
|Win
|
|align=left|Rafael Reyes
|KO
|1
|26/03/1993
|align=left|Ciudad Juarez, Chihuahua
|align=left|
|-
|Win
|
|align=left|Martin Lopez
|KO
|1
|19/12/1992
|align=left|La Paz, Baja California Sur
|align=left|
|-
|Loss
|
|align=left| James Rivas
|PTS
|4
|12/06/1992
|align=left| Casa Grande, Arizona
|align=left|
|-
|Win
|
|align=left|Sergio Garcia
|KO
|1
|24/03/1992
|align=left|Palenque del Hippodromo, Tijuana, Baja California
|align=left|
|-
|Loss
|
|align=left|Sergio Garcia
|TKO
|2
|16/08/1991
|align=left| Las Vegas, Nevada
|align=left|
|-
|Win
|
|align=left|Gary Chavez
|TKO
|1
|12/03/1991
|align=left| Phoenix, Arizona
|align=left|
|-
|Win
|
|align=left| Jose Cataneo
|PTS
|6
|18/12/1990
|align=left| Celebrity Theatre, Phoenix, Arizona
|align=left|
|-
|Win
|
|align=left| Alberto Garcia
|TKO
|3
|14/11/1990
|align=left| Phoenix, Arizona
|align=left|
|-
|Win
|
|align=left| Ty Horne
|TKO
|4
|02/11/1990
|align=left| Phoenix, Arizona
|align=left|
|-
|Win
|
|align=left| Troy Standley
|TKO
|1
|28/09/1990
|align=left| Tucson, Arizona
|align=left|
|-
|Win
|
|align=left|Quirino Garcia
|TKO
|3
|27/04/1990
|align=left| Tucson, Arizona
|align=left|
|-
|Win
|
|align=left|Jerry Booth
|PTS
|4
|07/07/1990
|align=left| Tucson, Arizona
|align=left|
|-
|Win
|
|align=left|Richard Palma
|PTS
|4
|28/04/1989
|align=left| Tucson, Arizona
|align=left|
|}

Return to bare-knuckle boxing

On Friday, August 5, 2011 Gunn fought Richard Stewart in the first sanctioned bareknuckle boxing match since 1999. Gunn defeated Stewart with a KO in round 3, winning the vacant heavyweight bareknuckle boxing title. Four months later, Gunn defended his bareknuckle crown, stopping Ernest Jackson in less than nine minutes.

Bare knuckle record

|- 
|Win
|align=center|1-0
|Irineu Beato Costa Jr.
|KO (Body Punch)
|BKFC 1: The Beginning
|
|align=center|1
|align=center|0:41
|Cheyenne, Wyoming, USA
|
|-

References

Further reading

External links
 

1973 births
Living people
Sportspeople from Niagara Falls, Ontario
Bare-knuckle boxers
Canadian male boxers
Cruiserweight boxers